Noah Troyer (February 18, 1831 – March 2, 1886), was an Amish Mennonite farmer who preached while being in a state of trance and who was seen as a "sleeping preacher".

Noah Troyer was born in Ohio in 1831. He married Fannie Mast of Holmes County, Ohio and had six children with her. In 1875 they moved to Johnson County, Iowa and bought a 160-acre farm there, three miles north of Kalona in Washington County, Iowa, which immediately adjoins Iowa County, where the Amana Colonies are situated. At that time, the Amana Colonies were the main American settlement of the religious community of the Inspirationalists, also known as the "Community of True Inspiration", who had brought trance preaching to North America.

After being ill for several days in March 1876, one evening Noah Troyer started to talk at some length while being asleep. Later he could not remember his talking. These states of trance continued for about two years and became more accompanied with cramping and convulsions. In 1878 he started to preach at some length in an unconscious state at the Amish Church. This preaching in an unconscious or trance state continued and he became generally known as a "sleeping preacher". Normally he preached for one to three hours. An article of the Herald of Truth reported on 15 May 1882 that he had preached together with John D. Kauffman (1847–1913), who was also an Amish "sleeping preacher", both in an "unconscious state", Kauffman after Troyer, each for about two hours.

On the morning of March 2, 1886, Troyer died in a hunting accident.

Literature 
 Noah Troyer: Sermons Delivered While in an Unconscious State : With a Brief Biographical Sketch of His Life, Iowa City, Iowa, 1879.
 Noah Troyer: Sermons Delivered by Noah Troyer, a Member of the Amish Mennonite Church, of Johnson County, Iowa, while in an Unconscious State. Second Book. Containing Six Sermons not before Published, together with Several Articles from Other Writers, Elkhart, Indiana, 1880, 103 pages.
 Steven Dale Reschly: The Amish on the Iowa prairie, 1840-1910, Baltimore and London, 2000, 268 pages. (One Chapter of 24 pages "Sleeping Preacher Strains" mainly on Noah Troyer)
 Harry H. Hiller: The Sleeping Preacher: An Historical Study of the Role of Charisma in Amish Society in Pennsylvania Folklife 18 (Winter 1968/69), pages 19–31.
 Phoebe A. Brubaker: Possession Trance and Plain Coats : The Lives, Times, and Trances of Amish Mennonite "Sleeping" Preachers Noah Troyer and John D. Kauffman, 1878-1920, manuscript at Mennonite Historical Library (Goshen College), History Senior Seminar, 2003, 194 pages.
 Becky Guengerich: Biography of a sleeping preacher, Noah Troyer, manuscript at Mennonite Historical Library (Goshen College), Horsch History Essay Contest paper, 1968, 8 pages.

References 

1831 births
1886 deaths
American Mennonites
American Amish people